Chuckawalla may refer to:

People
 Chuckawalla Bill, Spanish–American War and WW I veteran, prospector, cook, and vagabond

Locations
 Chuckwalla Mountains, in the Colorado Desert, California
 Chuckawalla Valley State Prison, near Blythe, California
 Little Chuckwalla Mountains, in the Colorado Desert, California

Animals
 Chuckwalla, a genus of lizards found in southwestern United States and northern Mexico
 Angel Island chuckwalla, a species of chuckwalla
 Spotted chuckwalla (alt. Catalina Island chuckwalla), a species of chuckwalla
 Peninsular chuckwalla, species of chuckwalla
 San Esteban chuckwalla, a species of chuckwalla

Animal common name disambiguation pages